Giant Orange is the third studio album by rock group Cheap Girls, released on February 21, 2012. It was the first release for the band after signing with Rise Records and is available on CD, vinyl and as a digital download. The album was produced by Laura Jane Grace of American punk rock band Against Me! and was the first time the band worked with a producer. With the exception of tambourine, the album was recorded using only guitar, bass, drums and vocals. The track "Gone All Summer" is the introduction music on Kyle Kinane's "Whiskey Icarus" stand-up comedy special released on CD and DVD.

Recording
Recording for the album began on October 11, 2011, at Total Treble Studio in Elkton, Florida. It was the first album recorded at the studio, which was converted from an old post office.

Release
The album was released on February 21, 2012. It debuted at number 49 on the Billboard Heatseekers Albums chart.

Singles
"Ruby" was released for digital download on January 3, 2012, as the first single from the album.

Critical reception 

Giant Orange received generally positive reviews from music critics. At Metacritic, which assigns a weighted average out of 100 to reviews from mainstream critics, the album has received an average score of 70, based on 6 reviews, indicating "generally favorable" feedback. Chrysta Cherrie of AllMusic rated the album three and a half out of five stars, writing that "its bold catchiness will keep listeners engaged, from the major chord melody and mid-'90s Merge Records grit of opener "Gone All Summer," to the ringing guitar and back-and-forth harmonies of "Mercy-Go-Round."

Track listing

Chart performance

Personnel
Credits are adapted from AllMusic

Major credits
Cheap Girls – Arranger, Primary Artist

Production credits
Laura Jane Grace – Producer
Robert Halstead – Engineer
Mike Zirkel – Mastering, Mixing

Music credits
Ben Graham — Drums, Percussion, Vocals
Ian Graham — Bass, Composer, Cover Photo, Guitar (Acoustic), Vocals  
Adam Aymor — Guitars

Misc credits
Scott Bell — Assistant
Tony Godino — Assistant
Salmon Nason — Technical Assistance
Heather Gabel — Art Direction
Jeff Rosenstock — Layout
Ryan Russell — Band Photo
Chris Trovero — Management

References

2012 albums
Cheap Girls albums